Glipostenoda ambusta is a species of beetle in the genus Glipostenoda. It was described in 1862.

References

ambusta
Beetles described in 1862